The Four Masters of the Yuan dynasty is a name used to collectively describe the four Chinese painters: Huang Gongwang, Wu Zhen, Ni Zan, and Wang Meng, who were active during the Yuan dynasty (1271–1368). They were revered during the Ming dynasty and later periods as major exponents of the tradition of “literati painting” (wenrenhua), which was concerned more with individual expression and learning than with outward representation and immediate visual appeal.

Huang Gongwang and Wu Zhen belonged to the earlier generation of artists in the Yuan period and consciously emulated the work of ancient masters, especially the pioneering artists of the Five Dynasties period, such as Dong Yuan and Juran, who rendered landscape in a broad, almost Impressionistic manner, with coarse brushstrokes and wet ink washes. While these painters were also respected by the two younger Yuan masters, the restrained thinness of Ni Zan and the almost embroidered richness of Wang Meng distinguished their work from that of their immediate predecessors.

The work of the Four Masters spurred experimentation with novel brushstroke techniques, with a new attention to the vocabulary of brush manipulation.

See also
Four Masters of the Ming dynasty
Six Masters of the early Qing period (Four Wangs)

Notes

References
Farrer, Anne, in Rawson, Jessica (ed). The British Museum Book of Chinese Art, 2007 (2nd edn), British Museum Press, 

Yuan dynasty painters
Quartets